The 1948–49 SM-sarja season was the 18th season of the SM-sarja, the top level of ice hockey in Finland. Eight teams participated in the league, and Tarmo Hameenlinna won the championship.

Regular season

External links
 Season on hockeyarchives.info

Fin
Liiga seasons
1948–49 in Finnish ice hockey